is a district located in Nagano Prefecture, Japan.

As of October 1, 2011, the district has an estimated population of 23,044. The total area is 268.42 km2. Northern Higashichikuma is increasing its population, while the Southern Higashichikuma is decreasing.

The district has a sister city relationship with the city of Chuncheon in South Korea.

There are five villages within the district.
Asahi
Chikuhoku
Ikusaka
Omi
Yamagata

History
April 1, 1959 - The town of Shiojiri and the villages of Kataoka, Hirooka, Souga, and Chikumaji merged to form the city of Shiojiri.
June 28, 1961 - The village of Seba merged into the city of Shiojiri.
April 1, 1973 - The village of Hata gained town status.
May 1, 1974 - The village of Hongo merged into the city of Matsumoto.
April 1, 2005 - The village of Shiga merged into the city of Matsumoto.
October 1, 2005- The town of Akashina merged with the towns of Hotaka and Toyoshina, and the villages of Horigane and Misato, from Minamiazumi District, to form the new city of Azumino.
October 11, 2005 - The villages of Honjō, Sakakita and Sakai merged to form the new village of Chikuhoku.
March 31, 2010 - The town of Hata merged into the city of Matsumoto.

Districts in Nagano Prefecture